Maisoncelles-du-Maine (literally Maisoncelles of the Maine) is a commune in the Mayenne department in north-western France.

See also
Communes of Mayenne

References

Maisoncellesdumaine